Pineville may refer to a place in the United States:

Pineville, Arkansas
Pineville, Kentucky
Pineville, Louisiana
Pineville, Missouri
Pineville, North Carolina
Pineville, Pennsylvania
Pineville, West Virginia
Pineville, Georgia
Pineville, South Carolina